Cytochrome c oxidase subunit 6B1 is an enzyme that in humans is encoded by the COX6B1 gene. Cytochrome c oxidase 6B1 is a subunit of the cytochrome c oxidase complex, also known as Complex IV, the last enzyme in the mitochondrial electron transport chain. Mutations of the COX6B1 gene are associated with severe infantile encephalomyopathy and mitochondrial complex IV deficiency (MT-C4D).

Structure 

The COX6B1 gene, located on the q arm of chromosome 19 in position 13.1, contains 4 exons and is 10,562 base pairs in length. The COX6B1 protein weighs 10 kDa and is composed of 86 amino acids. The protein is a subunit of Complex IV, a heteromeric complex consisting of 3 catalytic subunits encoded by mitochondrial genes, and multiple structural subunits encoded by nuclear genes.

Function 

Cytochrome c oxidase (COX), the terminal enzyme of the mitochondrial respiratory chain, catalyzes the electron transfer from reduced cytochrome c to oxygen. It is a heteromeric complex consisting of 3 catalytic subunits encoded by mitochondrial genes and multiple structural subunits encoded by nuclear genes. The mitochondrially-encoded subunits function in electron transfer, and the nuclear-encoded subunits may be involved in the regulation and assembly of the complex. This nuclear gene encodes subunit VIb. Three pseudogenes COX6BP-1, COX6BP-2 and COX6BP-3 have been found on chromosomes 7, 17 and 22q13.1-13.2, respectively.

Summary reaction:
 4 Fe2+-cytochrome c + 8 H+in + O2 → 4 Fe3+-cytochrome c + 2 H2O + 4 H+out

Clinical significance 

Mutations affecting the COX6B1 gene are associated with mitochondrial complex IV deficiency (MT-C4D), a disorder of the mitochondrial respiratory chain with heterogeneous clinical manifestations, ranging from isolated myopathy to severe multisystem disease affecting several tissues and organs. Features include hypertrophic cardiomyopathy, hepatomegaly and liver dysfunction, hypotonia, muscle weakness, exercise intolerance, developmental delay, delayed motor development, and mental retardation. Some affected individuals manifest a fatal hypertrophic cardiomyopathy resulting in neonatal death. A subset of patients manifest Leigh's syndrome. A COX6B1 R20C missense mutation has been linked to complex IV deficiency with encephalomyopathy, hydrocephalus, and hypertrophic cardiomyopathy.

Interactions 
COX6B1 has been shown to have 548 binary protein-protein interactions including 547 co-complex interactions.

References

Further reading

External links 
 
Mass spectrometry characterization of COX6B1 at COPaKB

Genes
Human proteins